Redhead is a 1962 West German-Italian drama film directed by Helmut Käutner. It was entered into the 12th Berlin International Film Festival.

Cast

References

External links

1962 films
1962 drama films
German drama films
West German films
1960s German-language films
German black-and-white films
Italian black-and-white films
Films directed by Helmut Käutner
Films produced by Carlo Ponti
Films based on German novels
Films set in Venice
Real Film films
1960s Italian films
1960s German films